Camo is a frazione of the comune of Santo Stefano Belbo in the Province of Cuneo, in the Italian region Piedmont, located about  southeast of Turin and about 60 km northeast of Cuneo.

The municipality of Camo was abolished on 31 December 2018. The former comune bordered the following municipalities: Cossano Belbo, Mango, Santo Stefano Belbo.

References

Cities and towns in Piedmont
Frazioni of the Province of Cuneo